Prison Break: The Final Break is a 2009 television film of the Prison Break franchise. The movie covers the events which occurred in between the downfall of The Company, and the revelation of Michael Scofield's (Wentworth Miller) death. It details the manipulated arrest and incarceration of Sara Tancredi (Sarah Wayne Callies) for the murder of Christina Scofield, the final escape plan which Michael devises for Sara, and the details surrounding Michael's death. It also reveals the ultimate fate of Gretchen Morgan (Jodi Lyn O'Keefe). This was the initial ending for Prison Break, until the release of season 5.

Plot 
Sara is arrested for the murder of Christina (Scofield) Hampton. She is held in the Miami-Dade State Penitentiary, where overcrowding necessitates that the female prison and jail inmates are housed in the same building. Prisoner Gretchen Morgan watches from a distance. Across the yard, Krantz and T-Bag are being held in the men's facility.

The General offers a $100,000 bounty for Sara's death. Sara is poisoned, but is saved by the prison doctor, who informs her that her baby will be taken away shortly after its birth.

Michael asks Warden Simms to protect Sara, but she refuses. Michael decides that he must break Sara out, enlisting Lincoln Burrows and Fernando Sucre's help. Gretchen sees Lincoln and Sucre scoping out the prison, and demands Sara include her in any escape.

Michael discovers a blind spot in the security cameras. Alexander Mahone, offered reinstatement with the FBI if he finds evidence incriminating Michael, offers to help Michael. FBI Agent Todd Wheatley breaks into Michael's apartment and sees the prison diagrams. When Michael returns, he says he was looking for weaknesses to report to Simms in the hopes that she grants him visitation.

Sara's attorney secures a court order allowing Michael to visit. Leaving the prison, he sees the cameras being adjusted to eliminate the blind spot.

Sara joins the "Family" of inmate Daddy, who gets her work in the motor pool, making Wife and other Family members suspicious.

Michael devises a new plan based on parachuting into the prison. Lincoln offer T-Bag $5,000 to help by setting off a fire alarm. T-Bag demands $100,000, suggesting they rob the bounty money from the General's agent, Joe Daniels. Lincoln and Sucre carry out the theft.

Gretchen kills a Family member who is attacking Sara. Gretchen again demands Sara include her in the escape because she wishes to see her daughter, Emily, and give her a gift. Daddy becomes infuriated when she hears what Sara and Gretchen have done.

It is revealed that Mahone has informed Wheatley about Michael's parachute plot. Michael continues to trust Mahone, giving him material to pass to Sara in the event of his death. Michael visits Sara and cryptically tells her the new plan; she must get to the chapel, which Michael has discovered has an emergency escape tunnel.

Just before the escape begins, Gretchen distracts a guard, and Sara confronts Daddy. Sara pushes Daddy into inmate Skittlez, instigating a larger altercation. Gretchen grabs the guard's keys, then hides in the kitchen with Sara.

Having been tipped off, Wheatley orders all lights shut off and positions armed officers near Michael's planned landing site. They shoot the parachutist, which turns out to be a dummy, while Michael sneaks out from under Wheatley's car.

Gretchen is spotted by guards, but she stalls them and covers Sara's presence, who makes it into the chapel. The guards take Gretchen away, but Sara retrieves the necklace that Gretchen made for Emily.

Michael reaches Sara, and they wait for T-Bag to get confirmation of the $100,000 and trip the fire alarm. Sucre reaches the money transfer store to find it closed; when T-Bag finds out that the money wasn't deposited, he reveals the plot to Simms. Wheatley responds by turning off the fire alarm and other systems that could cover escape noises.

Michael had predicted T-Bag's double-cross. With the alarms off, he burns through a locked door with a blowtorch. When the electronic lock on the next door stymies him, he instructs Sara to proceed as he goes elsewhere to short circuit the door. Sara refuses, but Michael emphasizes that this allows her to keep their baby. Michael is electrocuted while causing the short circuit. Sara escapes to a waiting Lincoln, Sucre, and Mahone. Mahone reveals he was part of Michael's true plan, and that Michael knew it required the deadly short circuit.

When Lincoln and Sara board a boat to the Dominican Republic, Sucre gives Sara the $100,000. Mahone gives Sara and Lincoln the material from Michael. On the boat, the two watch Michael's video, where he tells then that his terminal brain tumor had returned. He asks Lincoln to always be there for the child, and he asks Sara to watch out for Lincoln.

Cast

Starring

Guest starring

Release 
In the United States and Canada, the movie was first released on DVD and Blu-ray on July 21, 2009. It aired on May 27 in the United Kingdom on Sky1 and aired also on May 24 in Israel on Yes.

Reception 
Kevin Carr gave it 3.5 out of a possible 5 stars. Carr praises Sarah Wayne Callies for her role, but calls Lori Petty the scene stealer and "the most memorable character in the film."

References

External links 
 

2009 television films
2009 films
Films directed by Kevin Hooks
Films directed by Brad Turner
Films set in Florida
Prison Break episodes
Films scored by Ramin Djawadi